John Gargan may refer to:

Frank Gargan (John Francis Gargan), American football player and coach
John Gargan, see Candidates of the Queensland state election, 1950
John Gargan (footballer) (1928–2007), English footballer

See also
Jack Gargan (disambiguation)